Northallerton is a market town and civil parish in the Hambleton District of North Yorkshire, England. It lies in the Vale of Mowbray and at the northern end of the Vale of York. It had a population of 16,832 in the 2011 census, an increase from 15,741 in 2001. It has served as the county town of the North Riding of Yorkshire and, since 1974, of North Yorkshire. Northallerton is made up of four wards: North, Broomfield, Romanby and Central.

There has been a settlement at Northallerton since Roman times; however its growth in importance began in the 11th century when King William II gifted land to the Bishop of Durham. Under the Bishop's authority Northallerton became an important religious centre. Later, it was a focus for much conflict between the English and the Scots, most notably the Battle of the Standard, fought nearby in 1138, which saw losses of as many as 12,000 men.

In later years trade and transport became more important. The surrounding area was discovered to have large phosphorus reserves. These brought industry to Northallerton due to the easy trade routes. Lying on the main route between Edinburgh and London, it became an important stopping point for coaches travelling the route, eventually superseded by the growth of the railways in the 19th century. Lying in the centre of a large rural area, Northallerton was established as a market town in 1200 by Royal Charter, and there is still a market in the town today.

It continues to be a major retail centre for the local area. As the administrative centre for Hambleton district and the county of North Yorkshire, the councils, and several other associated public sector organisations have their headquarters in the town.

History

Origins and early history

Due to the proximity of the Roman road, entrenchments and relics it seems that the earliest settlement at Northallerton was some form of Roman military station. There is evidence that the Romans had a signal station on Castle Hills just to the west of the town as part of the imperial Roman postal system and a path connecting Hadrian's Wall with Eboracum (York) ran through what is now the neighbouring village of Brompton.

The first church was set up by St Paulinus of York on the site of the present All Saints Parish Church sometime in the early 7th century. It was made from wood and nothing survives of it. In 855 a stone church was built on the same site; fragments of stone have been found during restoration work which provide strong evidence of this Angle church.

It was believed that an Anglo-Saxon town known as Alvertune then developed. In Pierre de Langtoft's history of King Alfred he writes that in 865 it was the site of a number of battles between King Elfrid and his brother Alfred on one side and five Danish kings and a similar number of earls. Later, in the 10th century, Danes settled at Romanby and Brompton. A fine example of English stonecarving from the period, the Brompton Hogbacks, can be found in Brompton Parish Church.

In the Domesday Survey, Norman scribes named the settlement Alvertune, Aluertune and Alretone and there is a reference to the Alvertune wapentac, an area almost identical to the Allertonshire wapentake of the North Riding, which was named after the town.

The origin of the town's name is uncertain, though it is believed that the name derives from a derivation of the name Aelfere, Aelfereton translates as the farm belonging to Aelfere or even of King Alfred. Alternatively it may be referring to the Alder trees which grew nearby. The prefix of North was added in the 12th century to differentiate from the parish of Allerton Mauleverer,  to the south.

Its position on a major route way brought death and destruction to the town on many occasions. In 1069, in an attempt to quell rebellion in the north, the area between the Ouse and the Tyne was laid waste by the armies of William the Conqueror. The town of Northallerton was almost totally destroyed or depopulated. Just a few years later it is described in the Domesday Book as modo est in manu regis et wastum est (put down as waste).

Battle of the Standard

This was the first major battle between the Scots and the English since the Norman conquest and one of the two major battles in the civil war between King Stephen and Empress Matilda. The English forces were summoned by Archbishop Thurstan of York, who had gathered local militia and baronial armies from Yorkshire and the North Midlands. They arrayed themselves round a chariot with a ship's mast carrying the consecrated banners of St Peter of York, St John of Beverley, St Wilfrid of Ripon and St Cuthbert of Durham, it was this standard-bearing chariot that gave the battle its name. The Scottish army was led by King David I of Scotland.

King David had entered England in support of his niece, Empress Matilda, who was viewed as the rightful heiress to the English throne usurped by King Stephen. With Stephen fighting rebel barons in the south, the Scottish armies had already taken Cumberland and Northumberland, the city of Carlisle and the royal castle at Bamburgh. Finding the English in a defensive position on a hill, David elected to force a battle counting on his superior numbers, 16,000 Scots against 10,000 Englishmen. Repeated attacks by native Scots failed against the onslaught from the English archers, with losses of up to 12,000 Scots.  A subsequent attack by mounted knights met initial success but fell back due to lack of infantry support. The battle ended when David's reserve deserted, forcing him to retreat. The English elected not to pursue, and despite their great losses the Scots were able to regroup in sufficient number to besiege and capture Wark Castle.

The victory by the English ensured the safety of Northern England.

Religious importance

Shortly after his accession William Rufus gave the town, with the lands adjacent, to the see of Durham, and, under the patronage of the bishops of that diocese, it grew in importance, and became an episcopal residence. In 1130 a castle was built on the west side of the town adjacent to North Beck by Bishop Rufus and was expanded in 1142 after William Cumin seized the Bishopric of Durham in 1141. The castle was further expanded in 1173 by Hugh Pudsey and garrisoned by a group of Flemish soldiers, an act which enraged King Henry II who ordered that it be razed to the ground in 1177. A more substantial fortified palace surrounded by a moat was built on the same site in 1199, replacing the traditional motte-and-bailey castle. The palace became an important administrative centre for the bishops' lands in Yorkshire and served as a major residence for the bishops and their staff. The palace lay on the main road from York to Durham and was a regular stopping place for royalty and other dignitaries. The palace fell into ruin by 1658 and the site is now a cemetery.

In 1318, the town was destroyed by the Scots, under Sir James Douglas following the Capture of Berwick upon Tweed. A Carmelite priory was founded in 1354, but was demolished soon after the dissolution of the monasteries in 1538. The site passed to various people and was used for arable farming before a workhouse was built on the site in 1857. Subsequently, the Friarage Hospital, which takes its name from the friary, was built.

Following development of the site in 2006, archaeologists uncovered the remains of eight monks along with other artefacts.

Coaching and rail 
In the golden age of coaching, Northallerton had four coaching inns along the High Street serving passengers and horses travelling on several routes to the north. With the arrival of the railway in 1841 the town maintained its importance as a communications centre.
The line from London to Edinburgh via York and Newcastle passes through the town, as does the line linking the industrial West Riding with the port and steel town of Middlesbrough. It is now served by Northallerton railway station.

The Northallerton railway station to Ripon rail line was closed to passengers on 6 March 1967 and to goods on 5 September 1969 as part of the wider Beeching cuts, despite a vigorous campaign by locals, including the (nearby city of Ripon)'s MP.

Legal history
A house of correction opened in 1783 on East Road – it became HM Prison Northallerton, which served (at different times) as an adult prison, a Young Offender Institution, and a military prison. The prison closed in 2013 and is now partially demolished. It once had the world's largest treadmill. As of February 2021, the site of the former prison has two retail outlets, 'Iceland' and 'Lidl' situated on it.

The Quarter Sessions for the area were held in the town from the 17th century in various buildings including the Tollbooth, the Guild Hall and Vine House, but eventually a courthouse was built in East Road in 1875 as part of the prison complex. This later moved to the town's Racecourse Lane, and remains the area's magistrates' court.

When the Poor Law union system was introduced, a workhouse was established in the town to serve the three parishes in the area. This building is now part of the Friarage Hospital. When in 1856 the North Riding Constabulary was founded, one of the last county forces to be formed, Northallerton was selected as its headquarters, operating initially from premises in East Road.

The Thirsk Road drill hall was opened in 1911, just before the First World War.

Present day

Today Northallerton's main commercial function is a mixture of light industry, commerce and agricultural services, such as the regular livestock auction market and the production of high-grade manure.

The headquarters of North Yorkshire County Council (County Hall) and Hambleton District Council (the Civic Centre) are both located in Northallerton; these serve many parishes in the area. The RPA (Rural Payments Agency) was based here until its closure in 2014. The town also houses the headquarters of North Yorkshire Police (Alverton Court) and North Yorkshire Fire and Rescue Service at the former RPA building. The nearby base at RAF Leeming is a major source of employment and income in the area.

Expansion
David Wilson Homes, Yorkshire (East) Division submitted a planning application for the construction of 283 dwellings on the former York Trailers site (on Yafforth Road). This was approved on 14 May 2014, with construction expected to finish early 2019.

Hambleton District Council have plans to build 900 homes, a neighbourhood shopping centre, extra care facilities and a primary school, including sports pitches and allotments, as part of a North Northallerton development scheme. The scheme also includes a bridge crossing the Northallerton to Middlesbrough railway line between the A167 Darlington Road and A684 Stokesley Road.

Governance

Parish

The ancient parish of Northallerton covered a wide area. It included the townships and chapelries of Romanby, Brompton and Deighton, and the detached part of High Worsall on the River Tees. All of these places became separate civil parishes in the 19th century.

The parish council of Northallerton has exercised its right to be known as the town council. There are 12 town councillors, elected in four wards. The council is based at Northallerton Town Hall.

Local

In 1889 the County of York, North Riding administrative county was formed. In 1894 it was divided into municipal boroughs, urban districts and rural districts. Following a review of local government in 1974, the North Riding was abolished as an administrative county. The district council of Hambleton was then formed from the merger of the Northallerton Urban District with Bedale Rural District, Easingwold Rural District, Northallerton Rural District, Thirsk Rural District and Croft Rural District. This became part of the non-metropolitan county of North Yorkshire.

Policing in the town remains the responsibility of North Yorkshire Police and firefighting the responsibility of North Yorkshire Fire and Rescue Service. The fire station at Northallerton is a "Day Crewed" station which operates from 08:00 to 18:00 each day and on call outside these hours.

The town has been twinned with Ormesson-sur-Marne, a suburb of Paris, France since 1994.

Parliament
Northallerton was formerly a parliamentary borough. Its first representatives were John le Clerk and Stephen Maunsell, who were elected to the parliament of King Edward I in 1298, but for some reason or other no subsequent return was made until 1640, when the privilege was again resumed by order of the House of Commons.

From 1640 to 1885, the town formed the parliamentary borough of Northallerton, returning two Members of Parliament (MPs) until the Great Reform Act of 1832. Under the Act, boundaries were extended to include neighbouring Brompton and Romanby and representation was reduced to a single member. In 1885 the constituency was abolished and was absorbed into the Richmond division of the North Riding. The serving member for the Richmond constituency is the current Prime Minister, Rishi Sunak of the Conservative Party, who has held the seat since 2015 when he succeeded former party leader and Foreign Secretary William Hague. In modern times it has been an ultra-safe seat for the Conservative Party, which has held it since 1929.

Geography

Distance to other places

Topography

Northallerton lies north of the Vale of York, just south of County Durham and in the Vale of Mowbray. The proximity of these hills is significant in the climatology of the area. To the west of the town runs the River Wiske which is a tributary of the River Swale. In turn it has Brompton Beck, Turker Beck, Willow Beck and North Beck as tributaries, all of them flowing through the town. Although small in nature these have been the focus of flash flooding in the town and in Brompton village in recent years.

Climate
According to the Köppen classification the British Isles experience a maritime climate characterised by relatively cool summers and mild winters. Compared with other parts of the country, the Vale of York is slightly warmer and sunnier in the summer and colder and frostier in the winter. The mean annual daily duration of bright sunshine is three hours and 42 minutes.

There are two distinct local weather phenomena. The first is marked downslope lee wind caused by the proximity of the Pennines to the west, leading to super geostrophic winds which can reach in excess of 60 KT (70 mph), most commonly in winter and spring. In the winter, the presence of a subsidence inversion between the Pennines and the North York Moors can allow dense, persistent fog to form, sometimes lasting for several days.

Temperature extremes have ranged from  during July 2022, (making Leeming the northernmost place in the UK to exceed , down to  during December 2010.

The new 1981–2010 (as opposed to 1971–2000) averages from the Met Office show how the climate of Leeming has changed dramatically compared with most places in the UK. The average April maximum temperature is only 12.3 °C, compared with 14.1 °C previously. The average yearly temperature has decreased to 9.45 °C compared to 9.55 °C previously and in contrast most places of the UK have become warmer. The days have become cooler and the nights warmer. Winters have become much milder, summers cooler. Leeming now gets an additional 44.7 mm of rain per year, although also 62.3 more hours of sunshine. The climate of Leeming has generally lost its characteristics of being drier and with more seasonal variation, compared with the rest of the UK. Leeming recorded its warmest December temperature on record in 2015.

Demography

According to the United Kingdom Census 2001, the town of Northallerton had a total resident population of 15,741 or 18.5% of the total of Hambleton District. This is higher than the average population density of England (at ).

There are 8,203 females and 7,538 males, which works out for every 100 females there are 91.9 males.

The place of birth of the town's residents was 98.5% United Kingdom, 0.35% Ireland, 0.37% from other European Union countries, and 0.75% from elsewhere in the world.

Compared with the average demography of England, Northallerton has low proportions of people born outside the United Kingdom and ethnic minorities, and above average numbers of people over 65 years of age.

This table summarises the population changes in the town since 1801: the population grew in the early 19th century and again in the 20th century. In particular, between 1961 and 1991 the population more than doubled. The fall in population between 1851 and 1871 has been attributed to the collapse in coaching as the railways became popular.

Education
There are six primary schools in Northallerton, a secondary school and a Technology College. After completing primary education children move on to the Northallerton School, a secondary school and sixth form. In addition further adult learning courses are run at the college through the learndirect and Nextstep schemes. The college also runs courses through a Learn Direct centre at the Young Offender's Institute which is close to the college.

In addition there a number of privately run infant and day care nursery schools in Northallerton.

Northallerton School

Northallerton School's roots can be traced as far back as 1322.  Originally sited near the Parish Church, its initial role was to train boys in grammar and song. Parts of the old school building can be seen adjacent to All Saints' Church near the north end of High Street.

The school flourished in the 17th century under the mastership of Thomas Smelt, and notable alumni of that period include

 John Radcliffe (1652–1714), founder of Oxford's John Radcliffe Hospital and physician to William of Orange. 
 Theologians George Hickes and Thomas Burnet.
 Historiographer royal Thomas Rymer, doctor to King William of Orange.

The school struggled in the 19th century and almost closed at the start of the 20th century, with the number of pupils in single figures. However, following the 1902 Education Act the North Riding Education Committee resolved to build and restructure the grammar school. To that end a new school was built near the Thirsk Road, opening in 1909 with 104 pupils, half of whom were girls, the first time that they had been admitted. The school expanded throughout the 20th century. Following the 1944 Education Act, the school entry was based on the Eleven plus exam with all fees and charges being abolished. In 1973 the grammar school merged with the Secondary Modern Allertonshire School, which had opened in 1941, with the Allertonshire site taking pupils aged 11–14 and the grammar school site ages 14–18. By 1976 the comprehensive system was adopted and in 1994 the grammar school was renamed Northallerton College to better reflect the school's role in the community. In 2015 Northallerton College merged with Allertonshire School to become a full secondary school, with years 7 to 13 being educated at the Grammar School Lane site as of September 2018.

Economy
The economic activity of residents aged 16–74 was 44.3% in full-time employment, 15% in part-time employment, 6.8% self-employed, 2.5% unemployed, 2.6% students with jobs, 4.7% students without jobs, 15.8% retired, 6.5% looking after home or family, 5.3% permanently sick or disabled, and 3.1% economically inactive for other reasons.

The average price of a house in Northallerton for the 12-month period ending July 2008 was £209,082 compared to  £200,433 for North Yorkshire and the national average of £178,364.

Authorities and services

As the county town of North Yorkshire, the town's county hall is the administrative headquarters for North Yorkshire County Council. The headquarters of Hambleton District Council is also located in the town at Stonecross. 

The North Yorkshire Fire and Rescue Service has its headquarters on East Road while the North Yorkshire Police force is also located in Northallerton at Alverton Court – the latter moved from Newby Wiske in 2017. Other major employers include the Friarage Hospital which employs around 1,400 staff.

Agriculture
Being the centre of a large rural area it is the focus of agriculture with several businesses servicing the needs of farming. The auction mart regularly holds livestock auctions.

Ice cream
The world's third largest ice cream manufacturer (and second in Europe), Froneri, is headquartered in nearby Leeming Bar. It manufactures the Fab and Rowntree's Fruit Pastilles ice lollies.

Trade

The town is a market centre for the area and also draws traders from further afield to its two annual fairs (formerly four). Cattle drovers bringing cattle, horses and sheep from Northumbria and Scotland regularly came to the town. The original cattle market was by the church, but sheep were sold on High Street until the early part of the 20th century. With the arrival of the railway the mart was built close to the station, but this later closed and today the cattle market is held in Applegarth Court.

Retail
Within the town, three of the four major UK supermarkets can be found – Tesco, Sainsbury's and a small Asda near the town centre. There is also an M&S Simply Food close to the high street. The northern part of Northallerton is a developing area in retail with a Wickes, Topps Tiles and the town's industrial estate and business parks. Homebase ceased trading in May 2015 due to being unprofitable, and B&Q ceased trading in 2016 at the end of the lease, also due to not being profitable. The long High Street provides a wide variety of shops, restaurants, pubs and cafes. There are national retailers such as Costa Coffee, Caffè Nero, Pandora, Fat Face, Wilko (which occupies the former Woolworth's premises), Waterstones, O2, EE and Vodafone alongside local independent or regional retailers Betty's tearooms, Lewis & Cooper, Barker's department store and Boyes.

The oldest extant Indian restaurant in the town is the Lion of Asia, which is located on the High Street, having been in business in Northallerton for over 30 years.

On 15 November 2018, planning permission was granted for a £17 million project featuring retail, residential, leisure and office space as well as a large public square to transform the former Northallerton Prison site.

Transport

Road
Two main A roads pass through the town: the A684 runs approximately east–west through the town and acts as a link between the A1(M) motorway at Leeming Bar and the A19 at Osmotherley; the A167 runs approximately north–south between the A1(M) at Darlington and the A168 at Topcliffe. In addition the A168 runs from Wetherby via Thirsk to Northallerton.

Northallerton was built around the old Roman Dere Street, and thereafter remained a major stopping point on the coach routes between Scotland and London. Coaching operations declined in the mid 19th century after the railway was introduced to the town in 1841.

Rail

Nearby  is on the heritage Wensleydale Railway (which runs to ) and can be reached by the  Dales & District bus service between the stations. It is hoped that eventually passenger trains could connect with the Settle & Carlisle line at Garsdale, and that the section of line near Northallerton known as the South Curve can be upgraded to allow trains from the Wensleydale line to run into Northallerton and avoid reversing onto the main line. Limited goods, engineering and excursion trains use the North Curve.

Air

Sport

Football codes
Northallerton Town FC play in the Northern League, the second oldest football league in the world. Formed sometime before 1895 they have been known as both Northallerton and Northallerton Alliance before settling on their current name. They are the most southerly based team in the league. The team played in many minor leagues before joining the Northern League Division Two on its formation in 1982. In 1994 the club was declared financially insolvent and closed down, but were rescued by local businessmen in time for the 1994–95 season.

The club has never actually played in Northallerton, playing at the Bluestone Ground near County Hall in Romanby until 1974, then moving to its current location at the Regency Stadium on the outskirts of Romanby. The brothers Michael Dawson (Tottenham Hotspur defender), Andy Dawson (Hull City defender) and Kevin Dawson (Worksop Town defender) all started their football career at Northallerton Town.

Northallerton Rugby Union Football Club play at Brompton Lodge on the outskirts of Brompton. The team play in the second division of the Yorkshire League.

The recently formed rugby league club Northallerton Stallions has reached agreement with the rugby union club to play at their Brompton Lodge facilities.

Cricket
Cricket in Northallerton dates back to 1812, although the first recorded match played by Northallerton Cricket Club was in the early 1860s.  The club was one of the six founder member teams of the North Yorkshire Cricket League which was formed in 1893. They later went on to join the Thirsk & District Senior League in 1911, winning their first title in 1914.  Subsequently, known as the York Senior League, Northallerton won the championship a further 8 times.

In 1949, the club moved from its ground adjacent to County Hall to its current location at the end of Farndale Avenue in Romanby.  In 1965 a two tier pavilion was built at a cost of £6,500 and was opened with match against a Yorkshire XI which included Geoffrey Boycott.

The team currently plays in the North Yorkshire & South Durham Cricket League and fields three teams. The first 11 is currently captained by Liam Botham. A fourth team (the Wolves) plays in the Nidderdale League Division 7.

Aquatic
Northallerton has a leisure centre which is home to NASC (Northallerton Amateur Swimming Club) and Hambleton Seals Water Polo, who both play in competitive galas and matches. NASC recently came third in their moors league division which is an achievement for the club as they have not finished that high for a very long time. Hambleton Seals Water Polo are a newly formed team which aims to attract local children to a quite small, yet fun sport.

Media
It also transmits various digital television channels.

On 11 June 2007 Northallerton got its own radio station. Minster Northallerton, which was owned by the Local Radio Company. It broadcast on the frequencies 103.5 MHz and 102.3 MHz but later became part of Star Radio North East. After further changes, the Minster frequencies now carry Greatest Hits Radio York and North Yorkshire

The town is served by three local newspapers, North Yorkshire editions of the daily Northern Echo and the weekly Darlington & Stockton Times both published by Newsquest and the Northallerton, Thirsk & Bedale Times published by Johnston Press. Both publishers have local offices in the town.

Culture

Gallery
The landscape photographer Joe Cornish has a gallery in the town which displays his work and that of other photographers, and runs workshops on landscape photography.

Cinema

There was a cinema in Northallerton from 1939 until 1995. The Lyric, in the High Street, opened in October 1939 and also served as a theatre, with a capacity of 1,000 seats. It fell into disrepair and eventually closed in June 1995. The building was then bought by the New Life Baptist Church and converted to a place of worship.

Theatre
More recently The Forum, a multi-use arts and community centre, has staged a number of theatre productions and concerts. Having been built and run by Hambleton District Council, the Forum was taken over by a new registered charity in August 2012. Since mid 2011, with support from Cine Yorkshire, a project run by the National Media Museum, the Forum has been host to the latest digital cinema projection equipment and is showing mainstream films on a weekly basis – as well as live broadcasts from National Theatre Live and the Royal Opera House.

Public services

Emergency services
North Yorkshire and York Primary Care Trust guides primary care services (general practitioners, dentists, opticians and pharmacists) in the town, directly provides adult social care and services in the community such as health visiting and physiotherapy and also funds hospital care and other specialist treatments. The town is served by two GP surgeries: Mayford House Surgery and Mowbray House Surgery. The Friarage Hospital serves the local community, providing 281 beds. In 2007 it underwent a £21 million programme of refurbishment and new development.  It has close ties with the Ministry of Defence and acts in partnership with the MoD to provide medical care to military personnel. A number of military doctors, nurses and support staff are employed at the Friarage.

The Rutson Rehabilitation Centre, run by the North Yorkshire and York Primary Care Trust provides specialist support for stroke victims. It was due to close in spring 2008, as the building which opened in 1877 is not up to modern standards. However, the move has been delayed due to lack of space at the Friarage.
Following merger of Tees East and North Yorkshire Ambulance Service NHS Trust with the South Yorkshire Ambulance Service NHS Trust and the West Yorkshire metropolitan Ambulance Service NHS Trust in July 2006 the Yorkshire Ambulance Service NHS Trust is responsible for the provision of statutory emergency medical services in the town.

Utilities 
Mains water and sewerage services are provided by Yorkshire Water. Drinking water is supplied from Bullamoor Reservoir (a system of four covered concrete cisterns on the hillside east of the town) which are fed with water from the River Ure via Thornton Steward Reservoir. Until around 2006, Northallerton received its water from Cod Beck Reservoir near Osmotherley. The storage at Bullamoor was doubled in 2006 in anticipation of the closure of Cod Beck Water Treatment Works; Bullamoor Reservoir is also the primary source of water for Thirsk.  Sewerage is processed at Northallerton and Romanby Sewage Treatment Works, both in Romanby, which discharge into Willow Beck, a tributary of the River Wiske.

Popular culture
In the 1945 film The Way to the Stars, the Golden Lion Hotel in Northallerton's High Street was used as the pub. Its exterior is little changed today.

Notable people

Arms

See also
 Parliamentary borough of Northallerton
Railways in Northallerton
Beverley
Wakefield

Notes

References

External links

 Visitor information 

 
Market towns in North Yorkshire
Civil parishes in North Yorkshire
County towns in England
Hambleton District
Towns in North Yorkshire